Matanzima is a South African surname that may refer to 
George Matanzima (1918–2000), leader of Transkei, an area in South Africa and descendant of Ngubengcuka
Kaiser Matanzima (1915–2003), leader of Transkei, an area in South Africa, brother of George and descendant of Ngubengcuka
Lwandile Zwelenkosi Matanzima (1970/71–2010), South African clan leader and descendant of Ngubengcuka
Qaqambile Matanzima (1949–2013), South Africa politician and tribal leader and descendant of Ngubengcuka
Simphiwe Matanzima (born 1997), South African rugby union player
Themba Matanzima (born 1953),  South African Army officer 

Xhosa-language surnames